Orhan Çelebi (1412 – May 29, 1453)  was a prince of the Ottoman Empire. He had four sons: 'Ali Shah, Jahan Shah, Vali Khan, and Buga Khan. Orhan was the grandson of Süleyman Çelebi and son of Kasım Çelebi, thus a second cousin and a rival to Mehmed the Conqueror.

Orhan was sent to Constantinople as a hostage and the Ottomans paid tribute to the Byzantines during his time there to keep him out of the way. In 1453 he joined the defence of the Byzantine Empire during the Fall of Constantinople with about 600 Ottoman defectors by his side. They were charged with defending part of the sea walls, including the harbour of Eptaskalio.

There are several tales about exactly how it happened, but after the city had fallen, Orhan was caught and executed while attempting to escape.

References

Ottoman princes
1412 births
1453 deaths
15th-century people from the Ottoman Empire
15th-century Byzantine military personnel
Executed people from the Ottoman Empire
Fall of Constantinople
People executed for treason against the Ottoman Empire
People of the Byzantine–Ottoman wars
Pretenders to the Ottoman throne